OIM may refer to:

Office for the Internal Market, UK internal trade body
OIM (offshore installation manager), an oil-rig worker
 OIM, IATA code for Oshima Airport, in the island of Izu Ōshima, Tokyo, Japan
Tõnu Õim, correspondence chess player
Online Identity Management
Oracle Identity Management, an identity-management infrastructure for products from Oracle Corporation
Organisation internationale pour les migrations, the French name of International Organization for Migration
Orientation imaging microscopy